Psycho Café is the first full-length album from the band Bang Tango. It was released in 1989.

Critical reception
AllMusic wrote that "this excellent album demonstrates that not all bands that were part of L.A. glam metal in the late '80s/early '90s played mindless fluff." The Encyclopedia of Popular Music called Psycho Cafe "a refreshingly honest, but slightly offbeat, hard rock album."

Legacy 
Psycho Café peaked at number 58 on the Billboard 200 chart in 1989.

The music video for "Someone Like You" was a staple of early 1990s MTV.
The album was reissued reissued on CD by Rock Candy Records in September 2022.

Accolades 
"Someone Like You" was featured at number 9 in LA Weekly'''s "The 10 Greatest One-Hit Wonders of the Hair Metal Era" list.Psycho Café landed at number 37 on [[Rolling Stone|Rolling Stone's]] 50 Greatest Hair Metal Albums of All Time list.

Bang Tango came in at number 36 on VH1's Hair Metal 100 Countdown list, which cited Psycho Café'' as "taking hair metal in a direction that, in large part, led to the genre's undoing." It also stated that had the album come out a year later, it would have been more lumped in with the alternative metal at the time.

Track listing
All songs written and composed by Joe Leste, Tigg Ketler, Mark Knight, Kyle Kyle and Kyle Stevens
 "Attack of Life" – 4:18
 "Someone like You" – 4:20
 "Wrap My Wings" – 4:44
 "Breaking up a Heart of Stone" – 4:55
 "Shotgun Man" – 3:20
 "Don't Stop Now" – 3:26
 "Love Injection" – 4:31
 "Just for You" – 4:06
 "Do What You're Told" – 3:21
 "Sweet Little Razor" – 4:20

Personnel

Bang Tango 

 Joe Lesté – lead vocals
 Mark Knight – guitar
 Kyle Stevens – guitar
 Kyle Kyle – bass
 Tigg Ketler – drums

Production 

Howard Benson – production

References 

Bang Tango albums
1989 debut albums